The 2015 Texas Longhorns baseball team will represent the University of Texas at Austin during the 2015 NCAA Division I baseball season. The Longhorns will play their home games at UFCU Disch–Falk Field as a member of the Big 12 Conference. They will be led by head coach Augie Garrido, in his 19th season at Texas.

Previous season
In 2014, the Longhorns finished the season 5th in the Big 12 with a record of 46–21, 13–11 in conference play. They qualified for the 2014 Big 12 Conference baseball tournament, and were eliminated in the semifinals. They qualified for the 2014 NCAA Division I baseball tournament, and were placed in the Houston Regional, along with host Rice, former conference rival Texas A&M, and George Mason. In their first game, the Longhorns defeated Texas A&M by a score of 8–1, and then defeated Rice, 3–2, in 11 innings. In the regional final, the Longhorns again matched up with Texas A&M, and dropped game one to the Aggies, 2–3. However, they rebounded to win game two by a score of 4–1, and advanced to the Super Regional, of which they were selected as hosts. In the Super Regional, they were matched up with Houston, and swept the Cougars, 4–2 and 4–0, to advance to the College World Series.

In the College World Series, Texas opened up against UC Irvine and lost 1–3. In the loser's bracket, they rebounded to defeat Louisville, 4–1, and then defeated the Anteaters in a rematch, 1–0. In the semifinals, the Longhorns defeated Vanderbilt in the first game, 4–0, before falling in 10 innings to the eventual national champions by a score of 3–4.

Personnel

Roster

Coaching staff

Schedule

! style="background:#BF5700;color:white;"| Regular Season
|- valign="top" 

|- bgcolor="#bbffbb"
| February 13 || at #22  || #7 || Reckling Park • Houston, TX || W 3–1 || Duke (1–0) || McCarthy (0–1) || Culbreth (1) || 4,755 || 1–0 ||
|- bgcolor="#ffbbbb"
| February 14 || at #22 Rice || #7 || Reckling Park • Houston, TX || L 9–10 || Fox (1–0) || Clemens (0–1) || Ditman (1) || 4,259 || 1–1 ||
|- bgcolor="#ffbbbb"
| February 14 || at #22 Rice || #7 || Reckling Park • Houston, TX || L 2–5 || Salinas (1–0) || Sawyer (0–1) || Williamson (1) || 3,789 || 1–2 ||
|- bgcolor="#bbffbb"
| February 15 || at #22 Rice || #7 || Reckling Park • Houston, TX || W 4–3 (10) || Culbreth (1–0) || Williamson (0–1) || Johnston (1) || 4,388 || 2–2 ||
|- bgcolor="#bbffbb"
| February 17 ||  || #12 || UFCU Disch–Falk Field • Austin, TX || W 14-2 || Mayes (1–0) || Burns (0–1) ||  || 4,887 || 3–2 ||
|- bgcolor="#bbffbb"
| February 20 ||  || #12 || UFCU Disch–Falk Field • Austin, TX || W 13-2 || French (1–0) || Meyer (0–2) || Malmin (1) || 5,400 || 4–2 ||
|- bgcolor="#bbffbb"
| February 21 || Minnesota || #12 || UFCU Disch–Falk Field • Austin, TX || W 5-0 || Sawyer (1–1) || Sawyer (0–2) ||  ||  || 5–2 ||
|- bgcolor="#bbffbb"
| February 21 || Minnesota || #12 || UFCU Disch–Falk Field • Austin, TX || W 5-0 || Hollingsworth (1–0) || Shannon (0–1) || Culbreth (2) || 6,325 || 6–2 ||
|- bgcolor="#bbffbb"
| February 22 || Minnesota || #12 || UFCU Disch–Falk Field • Austin, TX || W 8-0 || Clemens (1–1) || Kunik (0–1) ||  || 4,663 || 7–2 ||
|- bgcolor="#bbffbb"
| February 24 ||  || #11 || UFCU Disch–Falk Field • Austin, TX || W 5-4 || Culbreth (2–0) || Martinez (0–1) ||  || 4,479 || 8–2 ||
|- bgcolor="#bbbbbb"
| February 27 ||  || #11 || UFCU Disch–Falk Field • Austin, TX || colspan ="7" | Cancelled (rain)
|- bgcolor="#bbbbbb"
| February 28 || San Diego || #11 || UFCU Disch–Falk Field • Austin, TX || colspan ="7" | Postponed to DH on Sunday, May 1 (rain)
|-

|- bgcolor="#ffbbbb"
| March 1 || San Diego || #11 || UFCU Disch–Falk Field • Austin, TX || L 1–3 (7) || Hill (1–2) || French (1–1) || Cornish (1) ||  || 8–3 ||
|- bgcolor="#ffbbbb"
| March 1 || San Diego || #11 || UFCU Disch–Falk Field • Austin, TX || L 1–6 || Hill (2–2) || Johnston (0–1) ||  || 4,921 || 8–4 ||
|- bgcolor="#ffbbbb"
| March 5 || at  || #15 || Sunken Diamond • Stanford, CA || L 4–5 || Thorne (1–0) || Hollingsworth (1–1) || Logan (3) || 1,246 || 8–5 ||
|- bgcolor="#ffbbbb"
| March 6 || at Stanford || #15 || Sunken Diamond • Stanford, CA || L 3–5 || Viall (1–1) || Bellor (0–1) || Hock (3) || 1,599 || 8–6 ||
|- bgcolor="#bbffbb"
| March 7 || at Stanford || #15 || Sunken Diamond • Stanford, CA || W 3-1 || French (2–1) || Hanewich (1–1) || Bellow (1) || 2,221 || 9–6 ||
|- bgcolor="#bbffbb"
| March 8 || at Stanford || #15 || Sunken Diamond • Stanford, CA || W 12-4 || Sawyer (2–1) || Weir (1–1) ||  || 2,010 || 10–6 ||
|- bgcolor="#bbffbb"
| March 10 ||  || #17 || UFCU Disch–Falk Field • Austin, TX || W 7-1 || Schimpf (1–0) || Richey (0–4) ||  || 4,946 || 11–6 ||
|- bgcolor="#bbffbb"
| March 13 || West Virginia || #17 || UFCU Disch–Falk Field • Austin, TX || W 4–3 (10) || Bellow (1–1) || Smith (2–1) ||  || 5,457 || 12–6 || 1-0
|- bgcolor="#ffbbbb"
| March 14 || West Virginia || #17 || UFCU Disch–Falk Field • Austin, TX || L 6–7 (10) || Ennis (1–0) || Culbreth (2–1) ||  || 6,411 || 12–7 || 1-1
|- bgcolor="#bbffbb"
| March 15 || West Virginia || #17 || UFCU Disch–Falk Field • Austin, TX || W 5-1 || Hollingsworth (2–1) || Donato (2–3) ||  || 5,787 || 13–7 || 2-1
|- bgcolor="#ffbbbb"
| March 17 || vs.  || #14 || Globe Life Park • Arlington, TX || L 5–6 (10) || Thornberg (1–0) || Culbreth (2–2) ||  || 4,123 || 13–8 ||
|- bgcolor="#bbbbbb"
| March 20 || Kansas State || #14 || UFCU Disch–Falk Field • Austin, TX || colspan ="7" | Postponed to DH on Saturday, May 21 (rain)
|- bgcolor="#bbffbb"
| March 21 || Kansas State || #14 || UFCU Disch–Falk Field • Austin, TX || W 5-3 || Bellow (2–1) || Courville (0–1) || Culbreth (3) ||  || 14–8 || 3-1
|- bgcolor="#bbffbb"
| March 21 || Kansas State || #14 || UFCU Disch–Falk Field • Austin, TX || W 3-1 || Hollingsworth (3–1) || Kalmus (0–2) || Bellow (2) || 5,372 || 15–8 || 4-1
|- bgcolor="#bbffbb"
| March 22 || Kansas State || #14 || UFCU Disch–Falk Field • Austin, TX || W 6-1  || Clemens (2–1) || Fischer (1–2) || Mayes (1) || 5,695 || 16–8 || 5-1
|- bgcolor="#bbffbb"
| March 24 || at  || #10 || Bobcat Ballpark • San Marcos, TX || W 6-4 || Culbreth (3–2) || Whitter (2–2) || Bellow (3) || 2,653 || 17–8 ||
|- bgcolor="#ffbbbb"
| March 27 || at  || #10 || Haymarket Park • Lincoln, NE || L 1–3 || Sinclair (4–3) || French (2–2) || Roeder (8) || 3,221 || 17–9 ||
|- bgcolor="#ffbbbb"
| March 28 || at Nebraska || #10 || Haymarket Park • Lincoln, NE || L 0–1 (15) || Chesnut (4–0) || Duke (1–1) ||  || 5,852 || 17–10 ||
|- bgcolor="#ffbbbb"
| March 29 || at Nebraska || #10 || Haymarket Park • Lincoln, NE || L 2–6 || Burkamper (4–1) || Hollingsworth (3–2) ||  || 5,793 || 17–11 ||
|- bgcolor="#ffbbbb"
| March 31 ||  || #23 || UFCU Disch–Falk Field • Austin, TX || L 4–6 (10) || Dorris (1–2) || Mayes (1–1) ||  || 5,293 || 17–12 ||
|-

|- bgcolor="#ffbbbb"
| April 3 || at Oklahoma State || #23 || Allie P. Reynolds Stadium • Stillwater, OK || L 3–6 (18) || Hassel (1–0) || Malmin (0–1) ||  || 1,504 || 17–13 || 5-2
|- bgcolor="#ffbbbb"
| April 4 || at Oklahoma State || #23 || Allie P. Reynolds Stadium • Stillwater, OK || L 1–3 || Buffett (3–1) || Hollingsworth (3–3) || Cobb (1) || 1,707 || 17–14 || 5-3
|- bgcolor="#ffbbbb"
| April 5 || at Oklahoma State || #23 || Allie P. Reynolds Stadium • Stillwater, OK || L 3–8 || Freeman (6–0) || Clemens (2–2) ||  || 816 || 17–15 || 5-4
|- bgcolor="#bbffbb"
| April 7 ||  ||  || UFCU Disch–Falk Field • Austin, TX || W 6-4 || McKenzie (1–0) || Williams (1–2) || Culbreth (4) || 5,201 || 18–15 ||
|- bgcolor="#ffbbbb"
| April 10 || Oklahoma ||  || UFCU Disch–Falk Field • Austin, TX || L 2–3 (12) || Garza (1–1) || Mayes (1–2) || Evans (3) || 6,807 || 18–16 || 5-5
|- bgcolor="#bbffbb"
| April 11 || Oklahoma ||  || UFCU Disch–Falk Field • Austin, TX || W 4-1 || Clemens (3–2) || Hansen (4–4) || Bellow (4) || 6,518 || 19–16 || 6-5
|- bgcolor="#ffbbbb"
| April 12 || Oklahoma ||  || UFCU Disch–Falk Field • Austin, TX || L 2–3 || Tasin (6–1) || Hollingsworth (3–4) || Evans (4) || 5,506 || 19–17 || 6-6
|- bgcolor="#ffbbbb"
| April 14 ||  ||  || UFCU Disch–Falk Field • Austin, TX || L 0–5 || Church (2–1) || Sawyer (2–2) ||  || 4,988 || 19–18 ||
|- bgcolor="#bbffbb"
| April 17 || at Kansas ||  || Hoglund Ballpark • Lawrence, KS || W 3–2 (14) || Marlow (1–0) || Villines (2–3) || Malmin (2) || 1,131 || 20–18 || 7-6
|- bgcolor="#ffbbbb"
| April 18 || at Kansas ||  || Hoglund Ballpark • Lawrence, KS || L 4–5 || Gilbert (2–2) || Mayes (1–3) ||  || 1,233 || 20–19 || 7-7
|- bgcolor="#bbffbb"
| April 19 || at Kansas ||  || Hoglund Ballpark • Lawrence, KS || W 16-7 || McGuire (1–0) || Weiman (1–6) || Duke (1) || 1,384 || 21–19 || 8-7
|- bgcolor="#bbffbb"
| April 21 || Texas State ||  || UFCU Disch–Falk Field • Austin, TX || W 7-3 || Sawyer (3–2) || Parsons (0–4) ||  || 5,615 || 22–19 ||
|- bgcolor="#bbbbbb"
| April 24 || at TCU ||  || Lupton Stadium • Fort Worth, TX || colspan ="7" | Postponed to DH on Saturday, April 25 (rain)
|- bgcolor="#ffbbbb"
| April 25 || at TCU ||  || Lupton Stadium • Fort Worth, TX || L 5–6 || Morrison (9–1) || French (2–3) || Ferrell (11) || 4,256 || 22–20 || 8-8
|- bgcolor="#ffbbbb"
| April 25 || at TCU ||  || Lupton Stadium • Fort Worth, TX || L 6–11 || Trieglaff (2–0) || Culbreth (3–3) ||  || 5,198 || 22–21 || 8-9
|- bgcolor="#ffbbbb"
| April 26 || at TCU ||  || Lupton Stadium • Fort Worth, TX || L 1–7 || Young (8–2) || Hollingsworth (3–5) ||  || 4,598 || 22–22 || 8-10
|- bgcolor="#bbffbb"
| April 28 ||  ||  || UFCU Disch–Falk Field • Austin, TX || W 12-4 || McKenzie (2–0) || Edward (0–4) ||  || 4,968 || 23–22 ||
|-

|- bgcolor="#bbffbb"
| May 1 || Texas Tech ||  || UFCU Disch–Falk Field • Austin, TX || W 3-0 || French (3–3) || Moseley (4–5) || Mayes (2) || 5,261 || 24–22 || 9-10
|- bgcolor="#ffbbbb"
| May 2 || Texas Tech ||  || UFCU Disch–Falk Field • Austin, TX || L 1–9 || Smith (6–3) || Culbreth (3–4) ||  || 7,018 || 24–23 || 9-11
|- bgcolor="#ffbbbb"
| May 3 || Texas Tech ||  || UFCU Disch–Falk Field • Austin, TX || L 1–5 || Moreno (3–3) || Mayes (1–4) ||  || 6,284 || 24–24 || 9-12
|- bgcolor="#bbbbbb"
| May 5 || Texas State ||  || UFCU Disch–Falk Field • Austin, TX || colspan ="7" | Cancelled (rain)
|- bgcolor="#bbffbb"
| May 16 || at Baylor ||  || Baylor Ballpark • Waco, TX || W 6-5 || Bellow (3–1) || Spicer (1–2) ||  || 2,804 || 25–24 || 10-12
|- bgcolor="#ffbbbb"
| May 17 || at Baylor ||  || Baylor Ballpark • Waco, TX || L 1–7 || Lewis (3–2) || Sawyer (3–3) || Hessemer (1) || 2,538 || 25–25 || 10-13
|- bgcolor="#bbffbb"
| May 17 || at Baylor ||  || Baylor Ballpark • Waco, TX || W 11-1 || Johnston (1–1) || Castano (4–6) ||  || 1,884 || 26–25 || 11-13
|-

|- 
! style="background:#BF5700;color:white;"| Post-Season
|-

|- bgcolor="#bbffbb"
| May 20 || Texas Tech || || ONEOK Field • Tulsa, OK || W 2-1 || French (4–3) || Smith (6–5) ||  ||  || 27–25 || 1-0
|- bgcolor="#bbffbb"
| May 21 || Baylor || || ONEOK Field • Tulsa, OK || W 4-3 || Culbreth (4–4) || Tolson (3–8) ||  ||  || 28–25 || 2-0
|- bgcolor="#bbffbb"
| May 23 || Baylor || || ONEOK Field • Tulsa, OK || W 4-0 || Mayes (2–4) || Kay (3–4) ||  ||  || 29–25 || 3-0
|- bgcolor="#bbffbb"
| May 24 || Oklahoma State || || ONEOK Field • Tulsa, OK || W 6-3 || French (5–3) || Reed (3–2) || Bellow (5) || 4,976 || 30–25 || 4-0
|-

|- bgcolor="#ffbbbb"
| May 29 || Oregon State || #30 || Horner Ballpark • Dallas, TX || L 4–5 || Church (1-) || Bellow (3–2) || Hickey (11) || 2,643 || 30–26 || 0-1
|- bgcolor="#ffbbbb"
| May 31 ||  || #30 || Horner Ballpark • Dallas, TX || L 1–8 || Taylor (7–1) || Culbreth (4–5) ||  || 3,242 || 30–27 || 0-2
|-

All rankings from Collegiate Baseball.

Rankings

References

Texas Longhorns
Texas Longhorns baseball seasons
Texas Longhorns Baseball
Texas